E. Casey Wardynski (born September 3, 1957) is an American government official, business executive, educator, and political candidate who served as Assistant Secretary of the Army (Manpower and Reserve Affairs).

Early life and education 
Wardynski was born in Fort Worth, Texas. He earned a Bachelor of Science from the United States Military Academy, a Master of Public Policy from the Harvard Kennedy School, and a PhD in policy analysis (economics, statistics, and decision making) from the Frederick S. Pardee RAND Graduate School.

Career 
Wardynski served in the United States Army from 1980 to 2010, including as an operations officer. He retired from the Army with the rank of colonel. Wardynski was also a professor of economics at the United States Military Academy and served as the director of the school's office of economic and manpower analysis. In 1999, Wardynski developed the idea of America's Army, a first-person shooter video game series designed as an Army recruitment tool. Wardynski was the CFO of Aurora Public Schools in Aurora, Colorado before becoming superintendent of the Huntsville City Schools in Huntsville, Alabama. Outside of education, Wardynski also worked as the CFO and CEO of FISH Technologies, LLC.

Wardynski was nominated to serve as Assistant Secretary of the Army (Manpower and Reserve Affairs) by President Donald Trump and was confirmed to the position on January 2, 2019. Wardynski resigned from his position on the last day of the Trump administration, January 20, 2021.

In April 2021, he declared his candidacy for Alabama's 5th congressional district in the 2022 election.

Wardynski currently serves as the CEO of Regenesis Stem Cell Center in Huntsville, AL. Having been over Army healthcare during his time as Assistant Secretary of the Army (Manpower and Reserve Affairs) and involved in executive positions before, he merged his experience into this current role. The clinic specializes in PRP and Stem Cell therapies, as well as a number of aesthetic services.

References 

1957 births
Alabama Republicans
Biden administration personnel
Candidates in the 2022 United States House of Representatives elections
Harvard Kennedy School alumni
Living people
People from Fort Worth, Texas
Trump administration personnel
United States Military Academy alumni
United States Military Academy faculty